Hysterical or Hysterics may refer to:

 Hysteria, unmanageable emotional excesses
 Hysterical (1983 film), a film from Embassy Pictures
 Hysterical (2021 film), a documentary film

Music
 Hysterics (band), also known as the Love-Ins, Where the Action Is! Los Angeles Nuggets 1965–1968
 Hysterical (album), the third album by Clap Your Hands Say Yeah
 Hysterics (Rolo Tomassi album)
 Hysterics (Nightingales album)

See also
 Hysteresis, the dependence of the state of a system on its history
 Hysteria (disambiguation)